Shane Horo is a New Zealand rugby league player who represented New Zealand in the 1988 World Cup. His brother, Mark, was also a New Zealand international and his nephew, Justin, currently plays in the NRL.

Playing career
Horo originally played in the Waikato Rugby League and represented Waikato. In 1985 he was selected for the New Zealand national rugby league team but did not play a Test Match. He spent the 1984 season in the Northland Rugby League competition and represented Northland.

He then moved to Auckland and competed in the Auckland Rugby League. In 1986, while playing for the Te Atatu Roosters, he won the ARL's Tetley Trophy after scoring the most tries in the competition. Horo later moved to the Northcote Tigers and represented Auckland. He played in three Test Matches for the New Zealand national rugby league team between 1987 and 1988.

Horo spent two seasons in England, playing for the Leigh Centurions in the 1987/88 season and the Castleford Tigers (Heritage № 668) in the 1988/89 season where he played 18 game and scored 11 tries.

References

Living people
Auckland rugby league team players
Castleford Tigers players
Leigh Leopards players
New Zealand Māori rugby league players
New Zealand national rugby league team players
New Zealand rugby league players
Northcote Tigers players
Northland rugby league team players
Rugby league wingers
Te Atatu Roosters players
Waikato rugby league team players
Year of birth missing (living people)